Pride of the Blue Grass is a 1954 American drama film directed by William Beaudine and starring Lloyd Bridges, Vera Miles and Margaret Sheridan. It is also known by the alternative title Prince of the Blue Grass.

Plot
Jim Nolan owns a stable of thoroughbred racehorses and employs Pop Wilson, a long-ago trainer, as a groom. Pop has a son, Danny, whose ambition is to become a jockey.

One day, Linda Mason brings her horse Gypsy Prince to the Nolan stable and ends up boarding him there, although Jim is convinced that the horse does not have the making of a champion. Linda takes a job as a waitress at the track restaurant to pay for her horse's keep.

Pop and Danny put long hours into training and riding Gypsy Prince, but just as he is about to win his first race, a bandage on the horse's leg comes loose and it stumbles before the finish line. Danny is injured and a doctor intends to euthanize the horse, but Linda talks him out of it.

After going to work for wealthy stable owner Helen Hunter, who also has a romantic interest in him, Jim at first alienates Linda, then is pleased to see that she and the Wilsons have nursed Gypsy Prince back to health. All are happily reunited after Linda's horse wins the next race.

Cast

References

Bibliography
 Marshall, Wendy L. William Beaudine: From Silents to Television. Scarecrow Press, 2005.

External links

1954 films
American sports drama films
Cinecolor films
1950s sports drama films
1950s English-language films
Films directed by William Beaudine
Allied Artists films
American horse racing films
1954 drama films
1950s American films